Little Bay de Noc is a bay in the Upper Peninsula of the U.S. state of Michigan. The bay opens into Lake Michigan's Green Bay.

The bay, consisting of approximately 30,000 acres (120 km²), is enclosed by Delta County.  The cities of Escanaba and Gladstone are on the west side of the bay and the Stonington Peninsula is on the east side.

The bay's name comes from the Noquet (or Noc) Native American people (thought to have been related to the Menominee of the Algonquian language group), who once lived along the shores. Douglass Houghton came to Sand Point (in Escanaba) in 1844 with his party of government surveyors to chart the land to the north.

Escanaba has a deep harbor, which made it a lumbering center.  The first sawmill was built there in 1836.  The bay also shipped iron ore from the rich iron ranges in Michigan's upper peninsula, with the first ore dock built at Escanaba in 1864.  Escanaba was incorporated in 1866.  A bit further north, Gladstone was founded in 1887 by U.S. Senator from Minnesota, William D. Washburn, to serve as a rail-lake terminal for lumber products.

The Escanaba, Days, Tacoosh, Rapid, and Whitefish rivers all drain into the bay.  Rapid River marks the mouth of the eponymous river and the head of the bay.

References

External links
Bays de Noc Convention and Visitors Bureau

Bodies of water of Delta County, Michigan
Bays of Michigan
Bays of Lake Michigan